Frank Henry O'Connor (September 15, 1868 – December 26, 1913) was an American baseball pitcher who played for the Philadelphia Phillies in 1893. He attended Dartmouth College.

Biography
O'Connor was born on September 15, 1868, in Keeseville, New York. He was 24 years old when he broke into the big leagues on August 3, 1893, with the Philadelphia Phillies as a left-handed pitcher. He played in only three games with a win–loss record of 0–0 and an earned run average of 11.25. He had two at-bats, and went 2–2 including a home run.

He is notable for becoming the only the second Major League ballplayer (and the first pitcher) to hit a home run in their last major league plate appearance.

He died in Brattleboro, Vermont on December 26, 1913.

See also
List of Major League Baseball players with a home run in their final major league at bat

References

Frank O'Connor Stats. Baseball Almanac
Baseball Reference

1868 births
1913 deaths
Major League Baseball pitchers
Baseball players from New York (state)
People from Keeseville, New York
Philadelphia Phillies players
19th-century baseball players
Dartmouth College alumni
Portsmouth Lillies players
Lowell (minor league baseball) players